Susan Lynn Bernard (February 11, 1948 – June 21, 2019) was an American author, actress, model and businesswoman from Los Angeles, California. She was the daughter of photographer Bruno Bernard.

Career
Susan Bernard was the author of six books, including Marilyn: Intimate Exposures,  Bernard of Hollywood's Ultimate Pin-Up Book and Joyous Motherhood.  
She was the president of Bernard of Hollywood/Renaissance Road Incorporated.

Bernard starred in the Russ Meyer film Faster, Pussycat! Kill! Kill! in 1965, and in two seasons of General Hospital in the late 1960s.

She appeared in Playboy in December 1966, and was believed to be the first Jewish Playmate of the month, though in recent years Cindy Fuller, Miss May 1959, has claimed that she was the first Jewish Playmate.

In an interview in the August 1998 issue of Femme Fatales, Bernard revealed, "I was the first under-18 Jewish virgin who was in the centerfold placed in front of a Christmas tree," and that she'd never been nude in front of anyone other than her mother prior to posing for Mario Casilli, who had been one of her father's apprentices.

Personal life 
Her father was photographer Bruno Bernard. Her husband, although they later divorced, was actor/playwright Jason Miller; their son is actor Joshua John Miller.

She died of an apparent heart attack on June 21, 2019.

Bibliography

Filmography

Films
 The Mao Game (1999)
 Teenager (1974)
 The Killing Kind (1973) .... Tina Moore (as Sue Bernard)
 Necromancy (1972) .... Nancy
 Machismo: 40 Graves for 40 Guns (1971) .... Julie
 The Phynx (1970) .... London Belly
 That Tender Touch (1969) .... Terry Manning
 The Witchmaker (1969) .... Felicity Johnson
 Stranger In Hollywood (1968) .... Woman
 Faster, Pussycat! Kill! Kill! (1965) .... Linda (as Susan Bernard)

Television
 The Smith Family - "No Place to Hide" (1971)
 The Beverly Hillbillies
 "The Girls from Grun" (1971) .... Girl
 "The Grunion Invasion" (1971) .... Girl
 Room 222 - "Funny Boy" (1969) .... Joellen
 General Hospital (1963) .... Beverly Cleveland Fairchild (1968–1969)

See also
 List of people in Playboy 1960–1969

References

External links
 
 
 
 Profile for her book 

1948 births
2019 deaths
Jewish American writers
American television actresses
Jewish American actresses
Actresses from Los Angeles
1960s Playboy Playmates
American film actresses
Female models from California
American women writers
20th-century American actresses
University of California, Los Angeles alumni
American people of German-Jewish descent
21st-century American Jews
21st-century American women